Thüringer Allgemeine (TA) is a German newspaper with its head office in Erfurt.

References

External links
  Thüringer Allgemeine

Newspapers published in Germany
Mass media in Erfurt
Companies based in Thuringia